Musicland Studios was a recording studio located in Munich, Germany. It was established by Italian record producer, songwriter and performer Giorgio Moroder in the early 1970s. The studio was situated in the basement of the Arabella High-Rise Building.

The Musicland Studios was used extensively throughout the 1970s and the 1980s by many artists, including Led Zeppelin, Queen, The Rolling Stones, the Electric Light Orchestra,  The Three Degrees, Iron Maiden, Marc Bolan & T.Rex, Donna Summer, Deep Purple, Rainbow, Amanda Lear, Freddie Mercury, Sweet, Olivia Newton-John, and Elton John. Most of them recorded under the supervision of Musicland's engineer and producer Reinhold Mack. Amongst others, the disco track "I Feel Love" by Donna Summer, Giorgio Moroder and Pete Bellotte was recorded in the studio, which is widely credited as one of the most influential records originating electronic dance music and paving the way for house and techno music.

The facility closed at the beginning of the 1990s, as the nearby U4 metro was affecting the recording quality.

References

Recording studios in Germany